The 1973/74 NTFL season was the 53rd season of the Northern Territory Football League (NTFL).

Waratah have won there 12th premiership title while defeating the Nightcliff Tigers in the grand final by 3 points.

Grand Final

References

Northern Territory Football League seasons
NTFL